The 2016 Dubai Sevens was the first tournament within the 2016–17 World Rugby Sevens Series. It was held over the weekend of 2–3 December 2016 at The Sevens Stadium in Dubai, United Arab Emirates.

Format
The teams are drawn into four pools of four teams each. Each team plays every other team in their pool once. The top two teams from each pool advance to the Cup bracket where teams compete for the Gold, Silver, and bronze medals. The bottom two teams from each group go to the Challenge Trophy bracket.

Teams
Fifteen core teams are participating in the tournament along with one invited team, the winner of the 2016 Africa Cup Sevens, Uganda:

Pool stage

Pool A

Pool B

Pool C

Pool D

Knockout stage

13th place

Challenge trophy

5th place

Cup

Tournament placings

Source: World Rugby (archived)

References

2016
2016–17 World Rugby Sevens Series
2016 in Emirati sport
2016 in Asian rugby union